John Gresham is the name of:

John Gresham (1495-1556), London merchant and mayor
John Chowning Gresham, United States Army officer
John Gresham (MP) for Newton, Horsham and New Windsor
John Gresham, character in Aces High (film)

See also
John Gresham Machen
John Grisham, writer and politician